Ahmed Samir may refer to:

Ahmed Samir (footballer, born 1981), Egyptian player
Ahmed Samir Farag, Egyptian footballer
Ahmed Samir (footballer, born 1991), Jordanian player
Ahmed Samir (footballer, born 1994), Egyptian player